The  was held on 6 February 2000 in Kannai Hall, Yokohama, Kanagawa, Japan.

Awards
 Best Film: 39 keihō dai sanjūkyū jō
 Best Actor: Ken Takakura – Poppoya
 Best Actress: Shinobu Otake – Kuroi ie
 Best Supporting Actor: Kazuki Kitamura – Kyohansha, Minazuki, 
 Best Director: Yoshimitsu Morita – 39 keihō dai sanjūkyū jō
 Best New Director:
Kentarō Ōtani – Avec mon mari
Akihiko Shiota – Moonlight Whispers, Don't Look Back
 Best Screenplay: Sumio Omori – 39 keihō dai sanjūkyū jō
 Best Cinematography: Nobuyasu Kita – Kuroi ie
 Best New Talent:
Yuka Itaya – Avec mon mari
Tsugumi – Moonlight Whispers
Takami Yoshimoto – Minazuki
Chizuru Ikewaki – Osaka Story
 Special Prize: Sumiko Fuji – The Geisha House (Career)

Best 10
 39 keihō dai sanjūkyū jō
 Spellbound
 Nodo Jiman
 Moonlight Whispers
 Kikujiro
 Osaka Story
 Kuroi Ie
 Wait and See
 Avec mon mari
 Adrenaline Drive
runner-up. Himitsu

References

Yokohama Film Festival
Y
Y
2000 in Japanese cinema
February 2000 events in Japan